The Governor of Edinburgh Castle, also sometimes known as the Keeper or Captain, had overall control of the Royal castle of Edinburgh, Scotland. The Governor was usually assisted by a Deputy-Governor and a Constable, the latter being under the command of the Lord High Constable of Scotland. The Governor had lodgings within the Castle, with a Governor's House being built in 1742. Although the post was never formally abolished, Governors ceased to be appointed after the death in 1876 of Henry Dundas, 3rd Viscount Melville.

The office was revived in 1936 as an honorary title for the General Officer Commanding of Scottish Command. However, since 2015, this is no longer the case, with General Officer, Scotland and Governor of Edinburgh Castle being two separate appointments.

Governors of Edinburgh Castle

 

After 1067 (d. 1121): Bartolf Leslie
1107-?: Thomas de Cancia
1153–1165: Geoffrey de Melville
1165–1214: Reginald
1171–1177: Rodbert
1230–1231: Philip de Mowbray, Constable
1251-?: Walter Comyn, Earl of Menteith (died 1258)
Dates unknown William, Constable
1263-?: William de Lysuris
1278–1292: William de Kinghorn
Dates unknown William Clerk
The castle was in English hands from 1291 to 1314, during the Wars of Scottish Independence.
1291–1296: Sir Ralph Basset de Drayton, English governor 
1296–1298: Sir Walter de Huntercombe, English governor 
1298-?: Sir John de Kingston, English governor - Captain and Constable
1300-?: William de Rue, English governor
1310–1314: Sir Piers de Lombard, English governor (from Gascony)

Following the Castle's recapture by the Scots under Thomas Randolph, 1st Earl of Moray in 1314, it was slighted and unused until the English returned in 1333.
1334-?: Sir John de Kingston, English governor
1336-?: Sir John Strivelyne, English governor
1337-?: Thomas Kynton, English captain and marshal, assassinated
1340–1341: Sir Thomas de Rokeby, English governor 

The castle was again recaptured by the Scots under Sir William Douglas in 1341.
...
1346: Sir David de Lindsay, Lord of Crawford 
1350-?: Sir Robert Erskine of Alva 
1360-?: John MacDonald, Lord of the Isles
1360(?)–1364: Archibald the Grim
...
c.1375–1382 Sir John Lyon
...
c.1400: David Stewart, Duke of Rothesay
...
1420: Sir William Borthwick 'the younger', 2nd of Borthwick 
1425 – 1433: Sir Robert de Lawedre [Lauder] of The Bass, Knt.
1437 – 1445: Sir William Crichton, Knt.
1447: Patrick Cockburn of Clerkington, Haddingtonshire.
1460:  Sir John Cockburn, Knight of Ormiston
1466: Sir Alexander Boyd 
...
1488-?: Patrick Hepburn, 1st Earl of Bothwell
...
c.1515-after 1524: James Hamilton, 1st Earl of Arran
...
 1544–1548: James Hamilton of Stenhouse
1548 - 1554 William Hamilton of Sanquhar.
c.1559 – 19 March 1566: John Erskine, 6th Lord Erskine
1566–1567:James Cockburn of Skirling 
1567–1568:Sir James Balfour of Pittendreich
1568–1573: Sir William Kirkcaldy of Grange, defended the castle for Mary, Queen of Scots, during the "Lang Siege"
1574-?: George Douglas of Parkhead
28 March 1579 – ?: Sir Alexander Erskine of Gogar
1584: James Stewart, Earl of Arran
...
?-1591: Sir James Hume, Captain.
1600?: Andrew Stewart, 3rd Lord Ochiltree
...
1615–1638: John Erskine, Earl of Mar
1638-?: John Elphinstone, 2nd Lord Balmerino
1639–1640: Sir Patrick Ruthven
1641-?: Alexander Leslie, 1st Earl of Leven 
1645-?: Alexander Lindsay, 1st Earl of Balcarres
1648: James Hamilton, 1st Duke of Hamilton
1650: Colonel Walter Dundas of Dundas 
1650: George Fenwick, appointed by Oliver Cromwell following his capture of the Castle 
1651–1652: Major-General Robert Overton, appointed by Cromwell
...
1661-?: John Middleton, 1st Earl of Middleton
1663-?: John Maitland, 1st Duke of Lauderdale
1664: Colonel James Murray   
...
1682–1686: William Douglas, 1st Duke of Queensberry
1686–1689: George Gordon, 1st Duke of Gordon, defended the castle for the exiled James VII
1689–1702: David Leslie, 3rd Earl of Leven
1702–1704: William Douglas, 1st Earl of March
1705-1712: David Leslie, 3rd Earl of Leven
1712–1714: John Campbell, 2nd Duke of Argyll
1714–1737: General George Hamilton, 1st Earl of Orkney
1737–1738: Charles Douglas, 2nd Earl of Selkirk
1738: George Ross, 13th Lord Ross
1738–1745: Lieutenant-General Sir James Campbell of Lawers  
1745–1752: General Lord Mark Kerr
1752–1763: Lieutenant General Humphry Bland
1763–1782: General John Campbell, 4th Earl of Loudoun
1782–1796: General Archibald Montgomerie, 11th Earl of Eglinton
1796–1801: General Lord Adam Gordon
1801–1827: General Sir Robert Abercromby
1827–1836: General George Gordon, 5th Duke of Gordon
1836–1837: General Hon. Patrick Stuart
1837–1842: General Lord Greenock
1842–1847: Lieutenant-General Sir Neil Douglas
1847–1852: General Sir Henry Riddell
1852–1854: General Sir Thomas Napier
vacant; Melville appointed retroactive to 1855
1860–1876: General Henry Dundas, 3rd Viscount Melville

Modern governors

1936–1937: General Sir Archibald Cameron of Lochiel
1937–1940: General Sir  Charles Grant
1940–1941: Lieutenant-General Harold Carrington 
1941–1945: Lieutenant-General Andrew Thorne
1945–1947: General Sir Neil Ritchie
1947–1949: Lieutenant-General Sir Philip Christison
1949–1952: Lieutenant-General Sir Gordon MacMillan
1952–1955: Lieutenant-General Sir Colin Barber
1955–1958: Lieutenant-General Sir Horatius Murray
1958–1961: Lieutenant-General Sir George Collingwood
1961–1964: Lieutenant-General Sir William Turner
1964–1966: Lieutenant-General Sir George Gordon-Lennox
1966–1969: Lieutenant-General Derek Lang
1969–1972: Lieutenant-General Sir Henry Leask
1972–1976: Lieutenant-General Sir Chandos Blair
1976–1979: Lieutenant-General Sir David Scott-Barrett
1979–1980: General Sir Michael Gow
1980–1982: Lieutenant-General Sir David Young
1982–1985: Lieutenant-General Sir Alexander Boswell
1985–1988 Lieutenant-General Sir Norman Arthur
1988–1991: Lieutenant-General Sir John MacMillan
1991–1993: Lieutenant-General Sir Peter Graham
1993–1995: Major-General Michael Scott
1995–1997: Major-General Jonathan Hall
1997–2000: Major-General Mark Strudwick
3 April 2000 – 17 November 2002: Major-General Robert Gordon
18 November 2002 – 8 July 2004: Major-General Sir Nicholas Parker
9 July 2004 – 21 January 2007: Major-General Euan Loudon
22 January 2007 – 19 June 2009: Major-General David McDowall
19 June 2009 – 25 October 2009: Major-General Andrew Mackay
26 October 2009 – 4 January 2012: Major-General David Shaw
4 January 2012 – 20 October 2015: Major-General Nick Eeles
20 October 2015–June 2019: Major-General Michael Riddell-Webster
 June 2019–present: Major-General Alastair Bruce of Crionaich

Notes

Bibliography

Edinburgh Castle
Edinburgh Castle
Edinburgh-related lists
Edinburgh Castle
Scottish ceremonial units